Inuksuk High School is the high school of Iqaluit, the capital of the Canadian territory of Nunavut.

History 
The school opened in late 1971 as the Gordon Robertson Educational Centre with 278 students and 28 teachers. Don King was the first principal. The school was built by two companies, Maurice Carrier Inc. and Wilfrid Legars Inc., both of Sainte-Foy, Quebec, at a cost of $3.3million. Canadian Industries Limited built the school's exterior walls from prefabricated glass-fiber reinforced plastic, a light-weight material that would reduce shipping costs. Exterior windows were made of three layers of glass, similar to the type used on airplanes, in order to provide thermal insulation.

Before the school was built, students were sent to Churchill, Manitoba, for high school.

References

High schools in Nunavut
Buildings and structures in Iqaluit
Education in Iqaluit